North Hanover Township is a township in Burlington County, in the U.S. state of New Jersey. As of the 2020 United States census, the township's population was 7,963, an increase of 285 (+3.7%) from the 2010 census count of 7,678, which in turn reflected an increase of 331 (+4.5%) from the 7,347 counted in the 2000 census.

North Hanover Township was incorporated as a township by an act of the New Jersey Legislature on April 12, 1905, from portions of New Hanover Township. Portions of the township were taken on March 4, 1918, to form Wrightstown.

Geography
According to the United States Census Bureau, the township had a total area of 17.51 square miles (45.35 km2), including 17.37 square miles (44.98 km2) of land and 0.14 square miles (0.37 km2) of water (0.81%).

McGuire Air Force Base is an unincorporated community and census-designated place (CDP) located in portions of both New Hanover Township and North Hanover Township that had a 2010 Census total population of 3,710, of which 2,973 were in the North Hanover portion of the CDP and 737 were in New Hanover.

Other unincorporated communities, localities and place names located partially or completely within the township include Arneytown, Ellisdale, Jacobstown, Sykesville and Wrightstown.

The township borders Chesterfield Township, New Hanover Township and Springfield Township in Burlington County; Hamilton Township in Mercer County; Upper Freehold Township in Monmouth County; and Plumsted Township in Ocean County.

The township is one of 56 South Jersey municipalities that are included within the New Jersey Pinelands National Reserve, a protected natural area of unique ecology covering , that has been classified as a United States Biosphere Reserve and established by Congress in 1978 as the nation's first National Reserve. Part of the township is included in the state-designated Pinelands Area, which includes portions of Burlington County, along with areas in Atlantic, Camden, Cape May, Cumberland, Gloucester and Ocean counties.

Demographics

2010 census

The Census Bureau's 2006–2010 American Community Survey showed that (in 2010 inflation-adjusted dollars) median household income was $72,410 (with a margin of error of +/− $5,321) and the median family income was $78,523 (+/− $10,326). Males had a median income of $55,352 (+/− $9,756) versus $37,052 (+/− $6,255) for females. The per capita income for the borough was $29,529 (+/− $2,650). About 3.3% of families and 7.7% of the population were below the poverty line, including 12.1% of those under age 18 and 9.7% of those age 65 or over.

2000 census
As of the 2000 United States census there were 7,347 people, 2,498 households, and 2,020 families residing in the township. The racial makeup of the township was 80.63% White, 10.96% African American, 0.48% Native American, 2.12% Asian, 0.05% Pacific Islander, 2.18% from other races, and 3.58% from two or more races. Hispanic or Latino of any race were 5.76% of the population.

There were 2,498 households, out of which 52.0% had children under the age of 18 living with them, 67.0% were married couples living together, 9.4% had a female householder with no husband present, and 19.1% were non-families. 15.5% of all households were made up of individuals, and 5.1% had someone living alone who was 65 years of age or older.  The average household size was 2.94 and the average family size was 3.29.

In the township the population was spread out, with 33.6% under the age of 18, 10.2% from 18 to 24, 34.9% from 25 to 44, 15.1% from 45 to 64, and 6.2% who were 65 years of age or older.  The median age was 29 years. For every 100 females, there were 100.5 males.  For every 100 females age 18 and over, there were 98.6 males.

The median income for a household in the township was $39,988, and the median income for a family was $45,553. Males had a median income of $31,698 versus $26,094 for females. The per capita income for the township was $17,580.  About 4.4% of families and 5.3% of the population were below the poverty line, including 6.4% of those under age 18 and 4.4% of those age 65 or over.

Government

Local government 
North Hanover Township is governed under the Township form of New Jersey municipal government, one of 141 municipalities (of the 564) statewide that use this form, the second-most commonly used form of government in the state. The Township Committee is comprised of five members, who are elected directly by the voters at-large in partisan elections to serve three-year terms of office on a staggered basis, with either one or two seats coming up for election each year as part of the November general election in a three-year cycle. At an annual reorganization meeting, the Township Committee selects one of its members to serve as Mayor and another as Deputy Mayor.

, members of the North Hanover Township Committee are Mayor Christopher A. Doyle (R, term on committee and as mayor ends December 31, 2022), Deputy Mayor David L. Forsyth Jr. (R, term on committee ends 2023; term as deputy mayor ends 2022), Ronald DeBaecke Jr. (I, 2022), Lou Delorenzo (R, 2020), John S. Kocubinski (D, 2024) and Brendan J. O'Donnell (D, 2024).

Federal, state and county representation 
North Hanover Township is located in the 3rd Congressional District and is part of New Jersey's 12th state legislative district. Prior to the 2011 reapportionment following the 2010 Census, North Hanover Township had been in the 30th state legislative district.

 

Burlington County is governed by a Board of County Commissioners comprised of five members who are chosen at-large in partisan elections to serve three-year terms of office on a staggered basis, with either one or two seats coming up for election each year; at an annual reorganization meeting, the board selects a director and deputy director from among its members to serve a one-year term. , Burlington County's Commissioners are
Director Felicia Hopson (D, Willingboro Township, term as commissioner ends December 31, 2024; term as director ends 2023),
Deputy Director Tom Pullion (D, Edgewater Park, term as commissioner and as deputy director ends 2023),
Allison Eckel (D, Medford, 2025),
Daniel J. O'Connell (D, Delran Township, 2024) and 
Balvir Singh (D, Burlington Township, 2023). 
Burlington County's Constitutional Officers are
County Clerk Joanne Schwartz (R, Southampton Township, 2023)
Sheriff James H. Kostoplis (D, Bordentown, 2025) and 
Surrogate Brian J. Carlin (D, Burlington Township, 2026).

Politics
As of March 2011, there were a total of 3,280 registered voters in North Hanover Township, of which 703 (21.4% vs. 33.3% countywide) were registered as Democrats, 907 (27.7% vs. 23.9%) were registered as Republicans and 1,668 (50.9% vs. 42.8%) were registered as Unaffiliated. There were 2 voters registered as either Libertarians or Greens. Among the township's 2010 Census population, 42.7% (vs. 61.7% in Burlington County) were registered to vote, including 60.6% of those ages 18 and over (vs. 80.3% countywide).

In the 2012 presidential election, Republican Mitt Romney received 1,211 votes here (55.2% vs. 40.2% countywide), ahead of Democrat Barack Obama with 934 votes (42.6% vs. 58.1%) and other candidates with 26 votes (1.2% vs. 1.0%), among the 2,192 ballots cast by the township's 3,469 registered voters, for a turnout of 63.2% (vs. 74.5% in Burlington County). In the 2008 presidential election, Republican John McCain received 1,336 votes here (55.9% vs. 39.9% countywide), ahead of Democrat Barack Obama with 1,005 votes (42.1% vs. 58.4%) and other candidates with 32 votes (1.3% vs. 1.0%), among the 2,390 ballots cast by the township's 3,413 registered voters, for a turnout of 70.0% (vs. 80.0% in Burlington County). In the 2004 presidential election, Republican George W. Bush received 1,421 votes here (59.6% vs. 46.0% countywide), ahead of Democrat John Kerry with 922 votes (38.7% vs. 52.9%) and other candidates with 26 votes (1.1% vs. 0.8%), among the 2,383 ballots cast by the township's 3,240 registered voters, for a turnout of 73.5% (vs. 78.8% in the whole county).

In the 2013 gubernatorial election, Republican Chris Christie received 1,040 votes here (72.9% vs. 61.4% countywide), ahead of Democrat Barbara Buono with 338 votes (23.7% vs. 35.8%) and other candidates with 19 votes (1.3% vs. 1.2%), among the 1,426 ballots cast by the township's 3,268 registered voters, yielding a 43.6% turnout (vs. 44.5% in the county). In the 2009 gubernatorial election, Republican Chris Christie received 995 votes here (63.8% vs. 47.7% countywide), ahead of Democrat Jon Corzine with 442 votes (28.4% vs. 44.5%), Independent Chris Daggett with 69 votes (4.4% vs. 4.8%) and other candidates with 33 votes (2.1% vs. 1.2%), among the 1,559 ballots cast by the township's 3,339 registered voters, yielding a 46.7% turnout (vs. 44.9% in the county).

Education 
Children in public school for pre-kindergarten through sixth grade attend the North Hanover Township School District. The district is the singular district for most of the township, except for portions on Joint Base McGuire-Dix-Lakehurst; the school district is one of three choices for K-12 students on the property of the base.

The North Hanover district operates three elementary schools, with two located in Jacobstown and one on the grounds of Joint Base MDL. As of the 2020–21 school year, the district, comprised of three schools, had an enrollment of 1,127 students and 124.1 classroom teachers (on an FTE basis), for a student–teacher ratio of 9.1:1. Schools in the district (with 2020–21 school enrollment data from the National Center for Education Statistics) are 
Endeavour Elementary School with 607 students in grades PreK-4 (on Joint Base MDL), 
Clarence B. Lamb Elementary School with 291 students in grades PreK-4 (in Jacobstown) and 
North Hanover Township Upper Elementary School with 227 students in grades 5-6 (in Jacobstown).

Public school students in seventh through twelfth grades attend the schools of the Northern Burlington County Regional School District, which also serves students from Chesterfield Township, Mansfield Township and Springfield Township, along with children of military personnel based at Joint Base McGuire–Dix–Lakehurst. The schools in the district (with 2020–21 enrollment data from the National Center for Education Statistics) are 
Northern Burlington County Regional Middle School with 743 students in grades 7 - 8 and 
Northern Burlington County Regional High School with 1,403 students in grades 9-12. Both schools are in the Columbus section of Mansfield Township. Using a formula that reflects the population and the value of the assessed property in each of the constituent municipalities, under which taxpayers in North Hanover Township pay 14.2% of the district's tax levy, with the district's 2013–2014 budget including $35.6 million in spending. The 7–12 district's board of education has nine members, who are elected directly by voters to serve three-year terms of office on a staggered basis, with three seats up for election each year. The nine seats on the Board of Education are allocated based on the population of the constituent municipalities, with three seats assigned to North Hanover Township.

Students from New Hanover Township, and from all of Burlington County, are eligible to attend the Burlington County Institute of Technology, a countywide public school district that serves the vocational and technical education needs of students at the high school and post-secondary level at its campuses in Medford and Westampton. All costs associated with attending the school are paid by the home school district, which is also responsible for student transportation to and from the school.

Transportation

Roads and highways

No Interstate, U.S., or State route pass through. County Road 528 and County Road 537. are the two main county routes that traverse the township.

Limited access roads that are accessible in neighboring communities include Interstate 295 (Hamilton Township), and Interstate 195 (Hamilton & Upper Freehold Township). While the New Jersey Turnpike is also in bordering Hamilton Township, the closest interchange is exit 7 in Bordentown Township.

Public transportation
NJ Transit provides bus service in the township on the 317 route between Asbury Park and Philadelphia.

Notable people

People who were born in, residents of, or otherwise closely associated with North Hanover Township include:
 Joe Borden (1854–1929), professional baseball player, 1875–1876
 George Sykes (1806–1880), represented New Jersey's 2nd congressional district in the United States House of Representatives from 1843 to 1845, and was reelected in 1845 to fill a vacancy, serving until 1847

References

External links

North Hanover Township website
North Hanover Township School District

Data for the North Hanover Township School District, National Center for Education Statistics
Northern Burlington County Regional School District

 
1905 establishments in New Jersey
Populated places in the Pine Barrens (New Jersey)
Populated places established in 1905
Township form of New Jersey government
Townships in Burlington County, New Jersey